The Diamond Jo Casino – Worth is a casino and entertainment complex in Worth County, Iowa, near Northwood. The casino is owned and operated by Boyd Gaming, which also owns the Diamond Jo Casino in Dubuque, Iowa.  It is a member of the Iowa Gaming Association, and its license is held by the Worth County Development Authority.  The property opened on April 6, 2006, with a grand opening celebration on April 18, 2006.

The Diamond Jo is located off of I-35 at Exit 214, just south of the Minnesota border. The casino, along with the nearby Top of Iowa Welcome Center are quickly creating a rapidly growing and developing area just off Exit 214. The Casino is also bringing business to the nearby towns of Northwood and Lake Mills. The casino is connected directly to Country Inn and Suites.  A new Holiday Inn Express hotel broke ground in summer 2010 and opened in 2011.

Gaming
The Diamond Jo offers 965 slot machines, including traditional slot machines, video slots, video poker and keno. There are a total of 22 table games, plus a FanDuel sports book area.

Entertainment
 The Event Center
 The Big Wheel Bar

Restaurants
 The Woodfire Grille
 The Kitchen Buffet
 Subway

Pheasant Links
Diamond Jo Casino – Worth and Peninsula Gaming envisioned an outdoor haven where a select number of sports enthusiasts could hunt for waterfowl and upland birds, shoot sporting clays and play golf on a challenging course - all in one location. After careful consideration, 440 acres of pristine, natural woodlands in southern Minnesota were selected. Abundant with verdant marshlands and lush landscapes, this site is also home to a private lodge.

Soon after opening its doors in 2006, Diamond Jo Casino – Worth purchased Arrowhead Golf Course located just outside Emmons, Minnesota.  Once purchased, DJC spent time renovating everything from facilities to fairways, reopening the course as Pheasant Links Golf and Hunting Preserve.  Currently, Pheasant Links consists of a nine-hole Scottish links-style course offering multiple tee boxes per hole.

Along with golf, Pheasant Links offers  9 sporting clay stations located throughout the golf course.  Pheasant Links is also a private hunting preserve with over 400 acres of huntable land with game including pheasant, quail, and chukar.  Deer hunting is also offered.

Pheasant Links is offered as a perk only for eligible regular casino customers.

References

External links

Casinos in Iowa
Buildings and structures in Worth County, Iowa
Tourist attractions in Worth County, Iowa
Boyd Gaming
2006 establishments in Iowa
Casinos completed in 2006